Richard Dybeck (1 September 1811 – 28 July 1877) was a Swedish jurist, antiquarian, and lyricist. He is mainly remembered as the author of the lyrics to what is now the de facto Swedish national anthem, Du gamla, Du fria.

Biography
Dybeck was born in the rectory of Odensvi parish, just outside the town of Köping in Västmanland, Sweden. He was the son of a clergyman, went to gymnasium in Västerås, and later matriculated at Uppsala University in 1831 with a law degree. He completed his civil service degree in law in 1834 and entered the Svea Court of Appeal. He held a number of positions in the court system during the following years, but eventually began to spend all his time on his antiquarian and historical research, not least in the field of runestones.
Dybeck wrote many poems. He was also known to be keenly interested in Asian culture, as was seen by his collection of historic prints and lithographs which originated from places like Myanmar and China. Dybeck died in 1877 at Södertälje and was buried at Norra begravningsplatsen in Stockholm.

At Dybecksgården in Odensvi, Richard Dybeck's bust is in bronze by Signe Ehrenborg-Lorichs, which was unveiled by Prince Wilhelm in 1937.

References

External links 
 

1811 births
1877 deaths
People from Köping Municipality
Uppsala University alumni
Swedish male poets
Swedish jurists
National anthem writers
19th-century Swedish poets
19th-century male writers
Swedish antiquarians
19th-century antiquarians

Burials at Norra begravningsplatsen